The Romantic Lead is the second studio album released by the Boston-based glam-rock band Gene Dante and The Future Starlets.  Produced by veteran A&R executive Peter Lubin (The Pixies), the album was released in early 2009 by Omnirox Entertainment as a follow-up to their 2006 self-titled debut EP.  It received favorable reviews from around the country as well as some international acclaim.

Track listing
 A Madness to His Method
 Purity of Intent
 The Starlet Hits the Wall
 Photosynthetic
 Brian, My Darling
 C Star
 OK Sunshine
 The Dreamers
 Like a Satellite
 This Is the Closing
 To a God Unknown

Personnel
 Gene Dante - lead and harmony vocals, rhythm guitar
 Scott Patalano - lead guitar
 Jim Collins - bass, harmony vocals
 Tamora Gooding - drums, percussion

Additional musicians and instruments
 Kevin Bents: piano, keys, guitar, synthetic/midi instruments & ambient textures, percussion, harmony vocals
 Strings & Horns arranged by Peter Lubin & Kevin Bents
 Interstellar Stutter Guitar: Kevin Bents
 Female Harmony Vocals: Jane Aquilina (To a God Unknown) & Jean Simon
 Male Harmony Vocals: Kevin Bents, Peter Lubin, Brett Fasullo, John Pinto Jr.
 Percussion & Acoustic Guitar: Peter Lubin
 Baritone Sax: Jon "The Lip" Lupfer
 Handclaps: The C Suckers
 Giant Mellotron: Emeen Zarookian

Production
 Producer: Peter Lubin
 Engineer: Jon Lupfer
 Mixed by: Peter Lubin & Jon Lupfer
 All Word and Music by: Gene Dante, except "The Starlet Hits the Wall" (words and music by Gene Dante and Ad Frank)
 Additional Engineering: Kris Smith & Patrick DiCenso
 Recorded at: Q Division Studios in Somerville, MA
 Additional Overdubs recorded at Bashville, NYC
 Mastering: Jeff Lipton (Peerless Mastering)

Graphics
 Art Direction: Rowan Bishop (Bridge Street Design)
 Photo Credit: Andrew Olson

Further reading

Album reviews
Boston Globe
All Music
BadEvan
Promipranger (Germany)
Driven Far Off
Opinion Hated
Chart Attack
Edge Provincetown
Luna Kafe
Soundtrack To My Day
Striker Bill

References

2009 albums